The 2019 Baltic Touring Car Championship was the twenty-first Baltic Touring Car Championship season. It began at Biķernieki Complex Sports Base on 10 May and ended at Auto24ring on 22 September.

Calendar

Teams and drivers

Baltic GT PRO

Baltic GT AM

TCR Sprint

BTC1

BTC2

Calendar and results

Scoring system

Championship standings

Baltic GT PRO

Baltic GT AM